The White Peacock (German: Der weisse Pfau) is a 1920 German silent drama film directed by Ewald André Dupont and starring Guido Herzfeld, Hans Mierendorff and Karl Platen. It was shot at the Tempelhof Studios in Berlin. The film's sets were designed by the art directors Paul Leni, Robert A. Dietrich and Otto Moldenhauer

Synopsis
Its plot follows an upper-class theatregoer who falls in love with a gypsy dancer at a music hall in the East End of London, a frequent scenario of Dupont's films at the time.

Cast
 Guido Herzfeld   
 Hans Mierendorff   
 Karl Platen   
 Adolf E. Licho   
 Grit Hegesa   
 Emil Rameau   
 Robert Scholz   
 Lore Sello

References

Bibliography
 Bergfelder, Tim & Cargnelli, Christian. Destination London: German-speaking emigrés and British cinema, 1925-1950. Berghahn Books, 2008.
 Kreimeier, Klaus. The Ufa Story: A History of Germany's Greatest Film Company, 1918-1945.University of California Press, 1999.

External links

1920 films
Films of the Weimar Republic
German silent feature films
1920 drama films
German drama films
Films directed by E. A. Dupont
Films set in London
German black-and-white films
UFA GmbH films
Silent drama films
Films shot at Tempelhof Studios
1920s German films
1920s German-language films